Forever Young: The Ska Collection is a compilation album by English band Madness, released in 2012 by Salvo/Union Square Music as part of their re-issues of the Madness back catalogue. The album consists of a selection of the band's ska sounding songs, including singles, b-sides and album tracks. In addition to the classic Madness tracks, the album contains two previously unreleased covers: Jimmy Cliff's "Vietnam" and Edvard Grieg's "In the Hall of the Mountain King". Both of these bonus tracks were originally recorded for the 2005 Madness album The Dangermen Sessions Vol. 1. The album includes a fold-out poster booklet with liner notes by Record Collector'''s Ian McCann, including new interviews with guitarist Chris Foreman and saxophonist Lee Thompson. Foreman said of the album: "It was our take on ska, and the songs on this album have ska as their basis. Not all are full-on; I wanted it to be called The Ska and Reggae Collection, but The Ska Collection'' it is."

Critical reception

AllMusic wrote, "While they were never strictly a ska band, Madness had more than their share of skanky moments, many of which can be found on this 24-track compilation." AllMusic felt that while longtime fans will appreciate the collection's "quirky" set list, listeners looking for "something with "Our House" on it" would be better off with a greatest hits album.

Track listing

Charts

Personnel
See individual albums for full personnel credits.
Madness
 Graham "Suggs" McPherson – vocals  
 Cathal Smyth – vocals, trumpet
 Mike Barson – piano, keyboards
 Chris Foreman – guitar
 Mark Bedford – bass
 Lee Thompson – saxophone
 Daniel Woodgate – drums
Technical
 Clive Langer – producer (1-22) 
 Alan Winstanley – producer (1-22)
 Madness – producer (23, 24)
 Kerstin Rodgers – cover photo
 Ian McCann – liner notes

Notes

References

External links

Madness (band) compilation albums
2012 compilation albums
Albums produced by Clive Langer
Albums produced by Alan Winstanley